Sarcocheilichthys caobangensis is a species of cyprinid fish endemic to Vietnam.

References

Sarcocheilichthys
Fish described in 2001